Laurie Kay McCauley is an American dental and medical scholar and academic administrator. She serves as the 17th and current provost and executive vice president for academic affairs of the University of Michigan since May 2022. 

Prior to her current role, she served as the William K. and Mary Anne Najjar Professor and dean of the University of Michigan School of Dentistry, as well as professor at the Department of Pathology of Michigan Medicine.

Education
McCauley received a Bachelor of Science with a major in education in 1980, a Doctor of Dental Surgery in 1985, a Master of Science in dentistry in 1988, and a Doctor of Philosophy in veterinary pathobiology in 1991, all from The Ohio State University.

Career
In 2002, McCauley was appointed the William K. and Mary Ann Najjar Professor of Periodontics and became department chair of Periodontics and Oral Medicine. While serving in this role, she was elected a Fellow of the American Association for the Advancement of Science for her "contributions to the field of skeletal physiology, particularly for delineating mechanisms of parathyroid hormone action during bone regeneration and pathophysiology of skeletal metastases." McCauley also edited a textbook on craniofacial mineralized tissues, developed a new graduate program in oral pathology, and a new e-learning dental hygiene degree program. Beyond the school, she also served in leadership positions with the council of the American Society for Bone and Mineral Research and the National Advisory Dental & Craniofacial Research Council at the National Institutes of Health. As a result of her academic background, she was also chosen to become an associate editor of the Journal of Bone and Mineral Research.

McCauley eventually stepped down from the role in 2012 to become the dean of the University of Michigan School of Dentistry. Upon stepping into her new role as dean, McCauley was elected a Member of the National Academy of Medicine. She also continued to conduct research in her laboratory by investigating hormonal control of bone remodeling. Her research was recognized by the American Society for Bone and Mineral Research with their 2019 Stephen M. Krane Award. During the COVID-19 pandemic, McCauley was awarded the American Dental Association’s 2021 Norton M. Ross Award for Excellence in Clinical Research.

References

External links

Living people
University of Michigan faculty
Ohio State University alumni
Fellows of the American Association for the Advancement of Science
Members of the National Academy of Medicine
American dentistry academics
Year of birth missing (living people)